The 1948–49 Scottish Division A was won by Rangers by one point over nearest rival Dundee. Morton and Albion Rovers finished 15th and 16th respectively and were relegated to the 1949–50 Scottish Division B.

League table

Results

References 

 Scottish Football Archive

1948–49 Scottish Football League
Scottish Division One seasons
Scot